Kalinin (Kyrgyz and ) is a village in Osh Region, southern Kyrgyzstan. It is part of the Kara-Suu District. Its population was 2,571 in 2021.

References

Populated places in Osh Region